Melicytus angustifolius  is a plant species in the family Violaceae.

References

angustifolius